Grevillea miqueliana is a species of flowering plant in the family Proteaceae and is endemic to Victoria in Australia. It is an erect to spreading shrub with elliptic to egg-shaped leaves and clusters of red and orange or yellow flowers.

Description
The lower surface is covered with velvety to shaggy hairs.

Taxonomy
Grevillea miqueliana was first formally described in 1855 by Ferdinand von Mueller in his Definitions of rare or hitherto undescribed Australian plants. The species epithet honours Dutch botanist Friedrich Anton Wilhelm Miquel.

In 2000, William Molyneux and Val Stajsic described two subspecies of G. miqueliana in the Flora of Australia, and in 2006, they described a third in the journal Muelleria. The names of the three subspecies are accepted by the Australian Plant Census:
 Grevillea miqueliana subsp. cincta Molyneux & Stajsic, commonly known as Selma Saddle grevillea;
 Grevillea miqueliana F.Muell. subsp. miqueliana, commonly known as oval-leaf grevillea; 
 Grevillea miqueliana subsp. moroka Molyneux & Stajsic commonly known as Moroka grevillea.

The main difference between the morphology of the subspecies is the nature of the hairs on the branches and leaves.

Distribution and habitat
Grevillea miqueliana occurs in montane areas of eastern Victoria. Subspecies cincta is only known from two sites in subalpine areas of central Gippsland, including Mount Selma.

Conservation status
Subspecies cincta is listed as "endangered" and subspp. miqueliana and moroka are listed as "vulnerable" under the Victorian Government Flora and Fauna Guarantee Act 1988.

References

External links
Herbarium specimen at Kew Botanic Gardens

miqueliana
Flora of Victoria (Australia)
Proteales of Australia
Taxa named by Ferdinand von Mueller